Arnapa is a genus of cellar spiders native to Indonesia, first described by B. A. Huber and L. S. Carvalho in 2019. It is named after West Papuan musician and cultural leader Arnold Ap.

Species
 it contains six species:
A. arfak Huber, 2019 (type) – Indonesia (West Papua)
A. manokwari Huber, 2019 – Indonesia (West Papua)
A. meja Huber, 2019 – Indonesia (West Papua)
A. nigromaculata (Kulczyński, 1911) – New Guinea
A. tinoor Huber, 2019 – Indonesia (Sulawesi)
A. tolire Huber, 2019 – Indonesia (Ternate, North Maluku)

See also
 Psilochorus
 List of Pholcidae species

References

Further reading

Pholcidae genera